Lotte Stein (1894–1982) was a German actress of the stage and screen. Of Jewish descent, she fled to the United States via Czechoslovakia and Portugal, and arrived at the Port of New York on board the S/S Mouzinho in June 1941.

Selected filmography

 The Closed Chain (1920)
 The Princess of the Nile (1920)
 The Curse of Silence (1922)
 Man by the Wayside (1923)
 The Burning Secret (1923)
 Father Voss (1925)
 Hussar Fever (1925)
 Doña Juana (1927)
 Leontine's Husbands (1928)
 Only a Viennese Woman Kisses Like That (1928)
 Don Juan in a Girls' School (1928)
 The Green Alley (1928)
 Guilty (1928)
 A Mother's Love (1929)
 The Copper (1930)
 Next, Please! (1930)
 Susanne Cleans Up (1930)
 Witnesses Wanted (1930)
 Police Spy 77 (1930)
 Of Life and Death (1930)
 Three Days of Love (1931)
 When the Soldiers (1931)
Errant Husbands (1931)
 Queen of the Night (1931)
 Mary (1931)
 The First Right of the Child (1932)
 The Burning Secret (1933)
 Scandal in Budapest (1933)
 A City Upside Down (1933)
 The Climax (1944)
 Swing Out the Blues  (1944)
 Captain Eddie (1945)
 Mother Wore Tights (1947)
 The White Tower (1950)
 The Midnight Venus (1951)
 All I Desire (1953)
 The Band Wagon (1953)
 The Night Without Morals (1953) 
 And That on Monday Morning (1959)

Bibliography
 Jung, Uli & Schatzberg, Walter. Beyond Caligari: The Films of Robert Wiene. Berghahn Books, 1999.

External links

1894 births
1982 deaths
German stage actresses
German film actresses
German silent film actresses
Actresses from Berlin
20th-century German actresses
German people of Jewish descent
German emigrants to the United States